On 28 November 1966, Michel Micombero, Burundi's 26-year-old Prime Minister, ousted the 19-year-old king (mwami) of Burundi, Ntare V, in a coup d'état. Ntare was out of the country at the time and the coup leaders quickly succeeded in taking control. Micombero declared an end to the monarchy and the Kingdom of Burundi became a republic with Micombero as its first President.

Background
The November coup of 1966 was the last of three coups to take place in Burundi during 1965 and 1966. The previous coups (in October 1965 and July 1966) followed the assassination of the country's Prime Minister, Pierre Ngendandumwe on 15 January 1965, and the country's first parliamentary election in May 1965. The assassinations, attempted coups, contentious elections and ethnic cleansing campaigns combined to make the period immediately following independence a tumultuous one for Burundian society.

On 8 July 1966 Crown Prince Charles Ndizeye announced that he was assuming the role of head of state of Burundi. He suspended the constitution, dismissed Prime Minister Léopold Biha, and asked Captain Michel Micombero to form a new government. On 12 July Micombero's government was installed with himself as prime minister. On 1 September, Ndizeye had himself crowned as Mwami Ntare V. Tension developed between Ntare, who wanted to actively rule as a monarch, and Micombero's government, which had aligned itself to reform and saw little need for an involved king.

Events

In his first move, Micombero announced the dissolution of the royal government and assumed the prerogatives of the head of state. Artémon Simbananiye, who served as Minister of Justice, was appointed Prosecutor General of the Republic. The governors of the provinces were replaced by officers. Before the formation of the new government, the National Revolutionary Committee was established on a temporary basis under the chairmanship of Micombero, which consisted only of officers.

Speaking on the radio, Micombero said:

Aftermath
There was little overt public response to Micombero's coup, and administration officials noted that rural residents seemed to be in a "stupor" in wake of the takeover. The new regime requested that its local officials report on how the population received its assumption of power. Some farmers feared civil war and refused to tend to their plots while citizens in the commune of Busiga felt that the coup meant the dissolution of the royalist UPRONA and its usurpation by the republican Parti du Peuple.

President Grégoire Kayibanda of Rwanda immediately extended his country's recognition to the new government of Burundi. Burundi's relations with Rwanda subsequently improved, and diplomatic relations between the two states were resumed.

References

Works cited
 
 

November coup
Burundi
Military coups in Burundi
1960s coups d'état and coup attempts
November 1966 events in Africa